The John Rogers Studio and Museum is the preserved studio of sculptor John Rogers, a popular American artist called  "the people's sculptor" in the latter 19th century.  It is located at 13 Oenoke Ridge in New Canaan, Connecticut, on the grounds of the New Canaan Historical Society, which opens it to the public.  The studio houses a collection of "Rogers Groups"—plaster statuettes often depicting two or more people. The display area has been reconfigured to reflect the feeling of the artist's studio.

Rogers Groups often depicted people interacting with each other in a sentimental scene. According to the National Historic Landmarks Program of the National Park Service, the museum's collection is "one of the finest collections of Rogers groups in the nation".

The studio is a Gothic-Victorian gable-roofed building built in 1878. John Rogers's popularity stemmed from the way his statuary groups created scenes of everyday life with a sentimental feel that has been compared to the much later Norman Rockwell. Instead of working in bronze and marble, he sculpted in more affordable plaster, painted the color of putty to hide dust.

Rogers was prolific as well as popular. During his 33-year career he produced almost 80,000 plaster copies of his 86 "Rogers Groups." His statuettes decorated Victorian parlors throughout the United States.

Sculpture on display includes "The Traveling Magician", showing a magician pulling a rabbit out of a hat for two children, and "The Neighboring Pews", depicting a moment among people in church. "Union Refugees" depicts a scene from the Civil War.

The studio was declared a National Historic Landmark in 1965. In 2003, a $95,000 matching grant under the Save America's Treasures program included financing for a climate-control and air-filtration system to ensure long-term preservation of both the building and the collection.

See also

List of National Historic Landmarks in Connecticut
National Register of Historic Places listings in Fairfield County, Connecticut

References

External links
 New Canaan Historical Society
 View of every John Rogers Group statue ever published (Statues purchased by collector)
 
 JohnRogers.org

Buildings and structures in New Canaan, Connecticut
National Historic Landmarks in Connecticut
Commercial buildings completed in 1878
Artists' studios in the United States
Art museums and galleries in Connecticut
Museums in Fairfield County, Connecticut
Rogers, John
Buildings and structures on the National Register of Historic Places in Connecticut
Historic American Buildings Survey in Connecticut
National Register of Historic Places in Fairfield County, Connecticut